Allen's yellow bat (Rhogeessa alleni) is a species of vesper bat. There is some taxonomic debate surrounding this species, with some authors considering Baeodon a genus rather than a subgenus. It is endemic to Mexico.

Taxonomy and etymology
It was described as a new species in 1892 by British zoologist Oldfield Thomas. Thomas noted that the eponym for the species name "alleni" was Harrison Allen, calling him "the chief authority on North-American bats." In 1906, Gerrit Smith Miller Jr. placed Allen's yellow bat into a newly-coined genus, Baeodon. At present, some authors keep Allen's yellow bat as part of Rhogeessa within the subgenus Baeodon, while others believe that it is distinct enough that Baeodon should be considered a monotypic genus rather than a subgenus.

Description
It is a small species of bat, weighing only . It has large ears, with long tragi. The tragi are rounded at the tips, with a straight or slightly concave inner margin and a slightly convex outer margin. The posterior edges of its wings are white. It has a small and narrow calcar.

Range and habitat
It is endemic to Mexico, with its range encompassing several states in southwest Mexico. Its habitat consists of tropical deciduous forests, thorny forests, deciduous forests, and xeric shrublands.

Conservation
It is currently evaluated as least concern by the IUCN—its lowest conservation priority. However, it is infrequently encountered and is considered rare or locally uncommon.

References

Bats of Mexico
Endemic mammals of Mexico
Least concern biota of Mexico
Taxonomy articles created by Polbot
Taxa named by Oldfield Thomas
Mammals described in 1892
Rhogeessa
Taxobox binomials not recognized by IUCN